Uzunova can refer to:

 Uzunova, Ardahan
 Uzunova, Kovancılar
 Uzunova, Kulp